Anglo-Spanish War may refer to:

 Anglo-Spanish War (1585–1604), including the Spanish Armada and the English Armada
 Anglo-Spanish War (1625–1630), part of the Thirty Years' War
 Anglo-Spanish War (1654–1660), part of the Franco-Spanish War
 Portuguese Restoration War (1662–1668), English support for Portugal
 War of the Spanish Succession (1701–1713), British support to Archduke Charles
 War of the Quadruple Alliance (1718–1720)
 Anglo-Spanish War (1727–1729) (1727–1729)
 War of Jenkins' Ear (1739-1748), later merged into the War of the Austrian Succession
 Anglo-Spanish War (1762–1763), part of the Seven Years' War
 Anglo-Spanish War (1779–1783), linked to the American Revolutionary War
 Anglo-Spanish War (1796–1808), part of the French Revolutionary and Napoleonic Wars
 The Spanish American wars of independence (1815–1819), British supporting role to the Decolonization of the Americas
 First Carlist War (1833–1840), British support to Queen Isabella II

See also
 Falklands Crisis of 1770
 Siege of Melilla (1774–1775)
 Nootka Crisis